Dragonfish may refer to:

Fish
Barbeled dragonfish, a small bioluminescent deep-sea fish of the family Stomiidae
Several species of fish of the family Pegasidae 
Violet goby, an eel-like brackish-water fish
Polypterus senegalus, a fish of the family Polypteridae
Asian arowana, a bonytongue fish of the family Osteoglossidae
Draconichthys, an arthrodire placoderm named after Stomiid dragonfishes

Other uses
 Dragonfish (novel), a 2015 novel by Vu Tran
 Dragonfish (Dungeons & Dragons), a fictional magical beast
 Dragonfish Nebula, an emission nebula and star-forming region

See also
 Dragonet, fish of the Callionymidae
 
 Sea Dragon (disambiguation)